Sofie Ege Grønlund (born 3 April 1999) is a Norwegian handball player who plays for Storhamar HE.

She also represented Norway in the 2017 Women's Junior European Handball Championship, placing 7th, and in the 2016 Women's Youth World Handball Championship, placing 4th.

Achievements
Junior World Championship: 
Silver Medalist: 2018
Norwegian League
 Silver: 2021/2022

References

1999 births
Living people
Sportspeople from Bergen
Norwegian female handball players